Route One or Die is the debut studio album by British experimental rock band Three Trapped Tigers. It was released on 30 May 2011 by Blood and Biscuits Records.

Release
Three Trapped Tigers announced the release of their debut studio Route One or Die on 4 March 2011.

The first single "Cramm" was released on 8 March 2011.

On 1 June 2011, Three Trapped Tigers released the music video "Noise Trade".

Tour
In support of the album, the band went on a UK tour with indie band Tall Ships in May 2011.

Critical reception
Route One or Die was met with "universal acclaim" reviews from critics. At Metacritic, which assigns a weighted average rating out of 100 to reviews from mainstream publications, this release received an average score of 84 based on 6 reviews.

In a review for Loud and Quiet, Matthias Scherer explained: "Route One or Die contains eight pieces of music that are melodic and thunderously fun. It's the latter quality that is often hard to pull off in instrumental music, but Three Trapped Tigers combine electronic influences with riffs Mastodon could do worse than rip off. Mark Davison at No Ripcord said: "Route One or Die is many things – immense, joyful, weird and above all aptly titled, as you'd be hard-pressed to find another debut album released this year – British or otherwise – that sounds so completely vibrant and alive." In The 405, Tom Davenport wrote: "Three Trapped Tigers are simply a rock band with the bravery to try anything. Some of this album feels like genuinely new ground, and it is a joy to comprehend. While Route One Or Die might fall short of perfection, it will remain a masterpiece."

Accolades

Track listing

References

External links
 
 
 

2011 debut albums